The University Ground was a test cricket stadium in Lucknow, India.

The first and the only international Test match was played on 23–26 October 1952 between India and Pakistan. The venue, however, was not as popular as Green Park Stadium in the nearby city of Kanpur which hosted most of the Test matches.

The stadium lies on the banks of the River Gomti. In 1994, the K.D. Singh Babu Stadium took its place as the city's premier cricket ground.

Test Centuries

Test Five wicket Hauls

See also
List of Test cricket grounds

References

External links
 cricketarchive
 One-Test wonder

Test cricket grounds in India
University sports venues in India
Defunct cricket grounds in India
Cricket grounds in Uttar Pradesh
University of Lucknow
Sports venues in Lucknow
Sports venues completed in 1949
1949 establishments in India
20th-century architecture in India